The Mrs. Dominican Republic 2007 pageant was held on March 22, 2007. That year only 20 candidates competed for the national crown. The chosen winner will represent the Dominican Republic at the Miss Universe 2007 pageant which was held in Mexico and at Reina Hispanoamericana 2007 pageant which was held in Bolivia. The First Runner Up went to Mrs. Continente Americano 2007 pageant which was held in Ecuador.

Results

Delegates

 *Withdrew

References

Miss Dominican Republic
2007 beauty pageants